Karl Schlaaf is a retired Swedish footballer. Schlaaf was part of the Djurgården Swedish champions' team of 1915. Schlaaf made 27 Svenska Serien appearances for Djurgården and scored 17 goals.

Honours

Club 
 Djurgårdens IF 
 Svenska Mästerskapet: 1915

References

Swedish footballers
Djurgårdens IF Fotboll players
Svenska Serien players
Association footballers not categorized by position
Year of birth missing